The 1971 NC State Wolfpack football team represented North Carolina State University during the 1971 NCAA University Division football season. The Wolfpack were led by first-year head coach Al Michaels and played their home games at Carter Stadium in Raleigh, North Carolina. The team competed as members of the Atlantic Coast Conference, finishing in sixth.

Michaels had been the defensive coordinator for the Wolfpack under Earle Edwards, and served as the interim coach after his retirement. Lou Holtz was hired as permanent coach shortly after the end of the season, and Michaels returned to the defensive coordinator position under Holtz.

Schedule

References

NC State
NC State Wolfpack football seasons
NC State Wolfpack football